Sacrificium is the sixth studio album by German symphonic metal band Xandria. The record was released on 2 May 2014 via Napalm Records.

In Latin, the word sacrificium means the performance of an act that renders something sacer, sacred. Sacrifice reinforced the powers and attributes of divine beings, and inclined them to render benefits in return (the principle of do ut des).

Background
According to the band, the new album will "continue the musical journey and direction" of their last album, Neverworld's End, but "will bring in even more of everything people liked" about it.

Right before recording began, the band parted ways with their singer of three years, Manuela Kraller. She was replaced by Dutch singer Dianne van Giersbergen, who also fronts the progressive metal band, Ex Libris. This record is also the first album to feature Steven Wussow on bass.

Track listing

Charts

Personnel
All information from the album booklet.

Xandria
 Dianne van Giersbergen – vocals
 Marco Heubaum – guitar, producer
 Philip Restemeier – guitar
 Steven Wussow – bass
 Gerit Lamm – drums

Additional musicians
 Amanda Somerville – narration
 Mark Burnash – narration
 Ben Mathot – violin
 McAlbi – tin whistle, low whistle
 Johannes Schiefner – bagpipes
 Jonas Pap – cello
 PAdam Chamber Choir – choir

Choir
 Maria van Nieukerken – choir conductor
 Annette Stallinga, Annette Vermeulen, Karen Langendonk, Marie Anne Jacobs, Angus van Grevenbroek, Gijs Klunder, Jan Douwes, Alfrun Schmid, Annemieke Nuijten, Aukje Vergeest, Frederique Klooster, Martha Bosch, Daan Verlaan, Koert Braches, Ruben de Grauw

Production
 Joost van den Broek – producer, recording, engineering, keyboards, programming
 Stefan Heilemann – artwork, layout, photography
 Arne Wiegand – engineering assistant
 Jos Driessen – engineering assistant
 Sascha Paeth – producer, recording, engineering, mixing

References

External links
Official discography on xandria.de

2014 albums
Xandria albums
Napalm Records albums